Anabelle "Belle" Smith (born 3 February 1993) is an Australian diver. She is 2022 Commonwealth Games champion in the 3 metre synchronized springboard. She competed in the 3 m springboard synchronized event at the 2012, 2016 and 2020 Summer Olympics. She won a bronze medal in 2016, and was placed fifth in 2012.

Diving
Smith competes in the 3 m springboard and 10 m platform synchro events. She has a diving scholarship with the Australian Institute of Sport and is a member of Gannets Diving Club. She trains at the Brisbane Aquatic Centre. She competes with Sharleen Stratton, following the retirement of her former partner Briony Cole.

Smith represented Australia at the 2010 Commonwealth Games, where she earned a bronze medal in the 10 m synchro platform with Cole. Competing with Stratton she won a bronze medal in the 3 m synchro springboard at the 2011 World Aquatics Championships with a score of 306.90. At the 2012 FINA Diving Grand Prix in Madrid she and Stratton finished second in the 3 m springboard synchro, scoring 293.58.

Before the 2014 Commonwealth Games Smith severely injured the middle finger on her right hand, when it was squashed by metal plates of a weight training machine. She returned to diving after three months and wore a hand brace for another five months. She did not fully recover the mobility in that finger.

Smith qualified for the Tokyo 2020 Olympics and competed in the Women's 3-metre springboard. She managed to get to the semi-finals.

At the 2022 Commonwealth Games, held in Birmingham, England, Smith and her partner Maddison Keeney won the gold medal in the 3 metre synchronized springboard with a score of 316.53 points, which was less than 20 points ahead of silver medalists Ng Yan Yee and Nur Dhabitah Sabri of Malaysia.

Personal life
Smith is of maternal Mauritian ancestry. She originally aspired to become a paediatrician, but abandoned the career path after realising she did not have the emotional control to work with sick children.

References

External links
 
 
 
 
 
 
 
 
 
 

1993 births
20th-century Australian women
21st-century Australian women
Australian Catholic University alumni
Australian female divers
Australian people of Mauritian descent
Australian Institute of Sport divers
Commonwealth Games bronze medallists for Australia
Commonwealth Games gold medallists for Australia
Commonwealth Games medallists in diving
Divers at the 2010 Commonwealth Games
Divers at the 2012 Summer Olympics
Divers at the 2014 Commonwealth Games
Divers at the 2016 Summer Olympics
Divers at the 2018 Commonwealth Games
Divers at the 2020 Summer Olympics
Divers at the 2022 Commonwealth Games
Living people
Medalists at the 2016 Summer Olympics
Olympic bronze medalists for Australia
Olympic divers of Australia
Olympic medalists in diving
Australian sports scientists
World Aquatics Championships medalists in diving
Medallists at the 2010 Commonwealth Games
Medallists at the 2014 Commonwealth Games
Medallists at the 2018 Commonwealth Games
Medallists at the 2022 Commonwealth Games